"Goodbye Little Darlin', Goodbye" (also known as "Goodby Little Darlin") is a song co-written and originally recorded by Gene Autry. Autry sang it in the 1939 movie South of Border, and in April 1940 released it on a 78 rpm record.

The song would be notably recorded by Johnny Cash.

The song was recorded by Cash at Sun Records probably on December 13, 1956, and released as a single (Sun 331, with "You Tell Me" on the opposite side) in September 1959, when he had already left the label for Columbia.

Background 
According to John M. Alexander's book The Man in Song: A Discographic Biography of Johnny Cash, the song wasn't released as a single:

Charts

References 

Johnny Cash songs
1959 singles
Songs written by Gene Autry
Songs written by Johnny Marvin
Sun Records singles
1939 songs
Gene Autry songs